The 2022 Victorian Football League season was the 140th season of the Victorian Football Association/Victorian Football League, a second-tier Australian rules football competition played in the states of Victoria, New South Wales and Queensland. The season commenced on 25 March and concluded with the Grand Final on 18 September.

The premiership was won by Casey, after it defeated Southport in the Grand Final on 18 September 2022 by 32 points. It was Casey's sixth Division 1 premiership.

League membership
Following its sole season in the VFL, the Brisbane-based Aspley Football Club withdrew from the competition, after reviewing its strategy as a football club and electing to focus on its QAFL and QFA teams and junior pathways without the burden of competing in the state level competition. The club departed with the shortest tenure of any VFA/VFL club in history, playing only ten games in the pandemic-interrupted 2021 season.

Aspley's departure left Southport as the league's sole stand-alone senior club based outside Victoria. A total of 21 clubs held licences to compete in the 2022 season.

Premiership season
 Source: Click here

Round 1

Round 2

Round 3

Round 4

Round 5

Round 6

Round 7

Round 8

Round 9

Round 10

Round 11

Round 12

Round 13

Round 14

Round 15

Round 16

Round 17

Round 18

Round 19

Round 20

Round 21

Round 22

Ladder

Finals series

Qualifying and Elimination Finals

Semi-finals

Preliminary Finals

Grand Final

Awards
The J. J. Liston Trophy was won by Tom Gribble (Werribee), who polled 30 votes. Gribble finished ahead of Boyd Woodcock and Jacob Dawson (both of Southport), who polled 22 votes. It was Gribble's second consecutive Liston Trophy, having won the 2019 Liston Trophy before the award's two-year hiatus.
The Frosty Miller Medal was won by Chris Burgess, who kicked 52 goals during the home-and-away season.
 The Fothergill-Round-Mitchell Medal was won by Ethan Phillips (Port Melbourne).
 The Coaches MVP award was won by 's Jacob Dawson.

See also 
 List of VFA/VFL premiers
 Victorian Football League
 Australian Football League
 2022 AFL season
 2022 VFL Women's season

References

Victorian Football League seasons
VFL